Dunukofia is a Local Government Area in Anambra State, South-East Nigeria. Towns that make up the local government are Ukpo, the headquarters; Ifitedunu, Dunukofia Umunnachi, Umudioka, Ukwulu and Nawgu. It shares boundaries with Awka North, Idemili North, Njikoka and Oyi Local Governments.

The population is predominantly agrarian, but major in-roads have been made in commerce and education.  Population density here is among the highest in all of Nigeria. There are general hospitals at Ifitedunu and Ukpo. There are also a dozen high schools for boys and girls. Dunukofia is among the most accessible local governments in Anambra State, with federal and state roads crossing it at different points. St Mary's High School Ifitedunu is categorised as one of the oldest post-primary schools in Anambra State.

Schools
The following secondary schools are in Dunukofia Local Government Area:
 St. Mary's High School, Ifitedunu
 Walter Eze Memorial Secondary School, Ukpo
 Community Secondary School, Umunnachi
 Nneamaka Girls’ Secondary School, Ifitedunu
 Community Secondary School, Ukpo
 Community Secondary School, Ukwulu
 Girls Secondary School, Umudioka
 Community Secondary School, Nawgu

Notable people

 Hon Sir Chukuwudi Okeke (Ikpoaku na Ukpo)
 Engr. Arthur Eze (Ozoigbondu)
 Charles Oramulu Onwuche - economist and political strategist

References 
 LOCAL GOVERNMENT AREAS IN ANAMBRA STATE dated July 21, 2007; accessed October 4, 2007

Local Government Areas in Anambra State
Local Government Areas in Igboland